Vodou Adjae is the first album of the Haitian music group Boukman Eksperyans. It is distributed in the United States and Canada by Mango, a division of Island Records. All of the songs are in Haitian Creole.

The following information is from the inside jacket of the CD :

For thirty-five years, compas was the rhythm and the music to which Haiti danced. But in 1989, BOUKMAN EKSPERYANS introduced a revolution in Haitian music that helped to revitalize interest in Haiti's traditional culture and religion (Vodou). Their particular brand of dance music, Vodou Adjae, bridged the dancefloor and the Vodou temple, mixing influences from religious drumming and from the high-energy springtime festival called rara.

Their message of unity, concern for Haiti's impoverished peasants, and intolerance for political corruption and neglect struck a chord with a country seeking identity and direction after a long period of political strife. The message was transmitted through an irresistible beat and BOUKMAN EKSPERYANS won both the contest for best song in Haiti in 1989 as well as the public imagination (and the sense of frustration with recent political events) is unmatched in modern Haitian history.

BOUKMAN was the slave leader who helped to launch the revolution that led to the overthrow of French colonialism and the birth of the first black republic in the world in 1804. BOUKMAN was also a priest of the new Afro-Haitian religion called Vodou that helped to unify the Haitian slave to carry out the revolution. BOUKMAN EKSPERYANS captures the experience embodied in the image of BOUKMAN: a blend of African and Christian spirituality, stubborn resistance to oppression, and a fierce pride in the people, history and culture of Haiti.

Track listing
 "Se Kreyól Nou Ye" (We're Creole)
 "Nou La" (We're Here)
 "Plante" (Plant!)
 "Ké-M Pa Sote" (My Heart Doesn't Leap/I'm Not Afraid)
 "Tribilasyon" (Tribulation)
 "Nou Pap Sa Bliye" (We Cannot Forget)
 "Wet Chen" (Get Angry, Break the Chains)
 "Mizik A Manzé" (Song for a Woman)
 "Mizeréré" (Misery Follows You)
 "Malere" (Poor)
 "Pwason Rat" (Rat Poison)

1991 albums